David Wessels (born 1982), is a South African-Australian professional rugby union football coach. He is currently the head coach of the Melbourne Rebels team that compete in the Super Rugby competition. He was previously head coach at the Western Force, and co-head coach of the Perth Spirit in Australia's National Rugby Championship. South African born, Wessels is a naturalised Australian citizen.

Wessels was born in Cape Town, South Africa, he then moved to Johannesburg where he attended St Stithians College before enrolling at Cape Town University. He was a defensive consultant to the Super Rugby team the Stormers in 2008 and 2009, before being appointed as an assistant coach at UCT (Ikeys) in the Varsity Cup from 2009 to 2011.

He moved to Australia as a defensive consultant to the Brumbies under head coach Jake White in 2012, and had a significant influence on the rejuvenated Brumbies with the team conceding the fewest points in the Australian Conference and the second least in the Super Rugby competition. He joined the Western Force as the senior assistant coach for the 2013 Super Rugby season. Wessels was appointed, alongside Kevin Foote, as co-head coach of the Perth Spirit for the inaugural season of Australia's National Rugby Championship in 2014.

Wessels became the caretaker head coach of the Western Force for the last three games of 2016, before being appointed as head coach for the 2017 Super Rugby season.

Following the Australian Rugby Union's decision to exclude the Force from Super Rugby after the 2017 season, Wessels joined the Melbourne Rebels as head coach in September 2017, signing a two-year deal with the team. He coached the team for three and a half seasons before departing ahead of the Super Rugby Trans-Tasman competition in 2021.

References

Living people
South African rugby union coaches
Australian rugby union coaches
1982 births
Western Force coaches
Melbourne Rebels coaches